The Dallas Hilltoppers represented the University of Dallas (Holy Trinity College before 1910) in Dallas in the sport of college football. Hall of famer Joe Utay coached the 1909 team to a 7–1–1 record, and the 1915 team claimed an independent Southwestern championship.

References

 
American football teams established in 1907
American football teams disestablished in 1925
1907 establishments in Texas
1925 disestablishments in Texas